Buzet-sur-Baïse (literally Buzet on Baïse) is a commune in the Lot-et-Garonne department in southwestern France. It stands on the voie verte cycle path between the Mediterranean and close to Bordeaux.

Population

See also
Communes of the Lot-et-Garonne department

References

Communes of Lot-et-Garonne
Lot-et-Garonne communes articles needing translation from French Wikipedia